Lophophytum is a genus of flowering plants belonging to the family Balanophoraceae.

Its native range is Western South America to Brazil and Northern Argentina.

Species:

Lophophytum mirabile 
Lophophytum pyramidale 
Lophophytum rizzoi 
Lophophytum weddelii

References

Balanophoraceae
Santalales genera